The following is a list of concept cars and other vehicles, presented by BMW.

References